Valley Park is a census-designated place and unincorporated community in Issaquena County, Mississippi, United States. Its elevation is 95 feet (29 m). Although unincorporated, it has a post office, with the ZIP code of 39177.

It was first named as a CDP in the 2020 Census which listed a population of 71.

History
Valley Park is located on the Canadian National Railway and was originally known as Halpin. A post office operated under the name Halpin from 1884 to 1890 and first began operating under the name Valley Park in 1890.

Demographics

2020 census

Note: the US Census treats Hispanic/Latino as an ethnic category. This table excludes Latinos from the racial categories and assigns them to a separate category. Hispanics/Latinos can be of any race.

Film set
A movie set resembling a rural radio station was constructed west of Valley Park in order to film a scene for the movie O Brother, Where Art Thou? (2000).  In the movie, the "Soggy Bottom Boys" recorded Man of Constant Sorrow at radio station "WEZY".  Only the mast tower remains at this location: .

2010 Tornado
On April 24, 2010, Valley Park was the site of a strong tornado, though no injuries were reported. The supercell thunderstorm dropped another tornado in Yazoo City.

Education
South Delta School District operates public schools serving the area, including South Delta High School.

Notable people
 Buddie Newman, Speaker of the Mississippi House of Representatives from 1976 to 1988.
 J. C. Newman, father of Buddie Newman. Member of the Mississippi House of Representatives from 1931 to 1940 and 1944 to 1945.

Gallery

References

Unincorporated communities in Issaquena County, Mississippi
Unincorporated communities in Mississippi
Census-designated places in Issaquena County, Mississippi